Andreas Vangstad (born 24 March 1992) is a Norwegian former professional cyclist, who rode professionally between 2014 and 2019 for the  and  teams. He was named in the startlist for the 2015 UCI World Time Trial Championships.

Major results

2013
 6th Time trial, National Road Championships
2014
 National Road Championships
1st  Under-23 time trial
3rd Time trial
 7th Time trial, UCI Under-23 Road World Championships
2015
 1st Fyen Rundt
 2nd Time trial, National Road Championships
 5th Overall Tour of Norway
1st Stage 5
2016
 1st Sundvolden GP
 3rd Time trial, National Road Championships
2017
 1st Prologue Troféu Joaquim Agostinho
 2nd Time trial, National Road Championships
 3rd Clássica Aldeias do Xisto
 3rd Clássica da Arrábida
 4th Sundvolden GP
 9th Overall Tour of Norway
 10th Overall Tour des Fjords
2018
 3rd Sundvolden GP
 7th Time trial, National Road Championships

References

External links

1992 births
Living people
Sportspeople from Kristiansand
Norwegian male cyclists